Ajdir, Taza is a town in Taza Province, Fès-Meknès, Morocco.

References

Populated places in Taza Province